The red-tailed bristlebill (Bleda syndactylus) or common bristlebill, is a species of songbird in the bulbul family, Pycnonotidae.
It is widely present throughout the African tropical rainforest.

Taxonomy and systematics
The red-tailed bristlebill was originally described in the genus Dasycephala (a synonym for Attila).

Subspecies
Two subspecies are recognized:
 Gabon bristlebill (B. s. syndactylus) - (Swainson, 1837): Found from Sierra Leone to western Democratic Republic of the Congo and northern Angola
 Uganda bristlebill (B. s. woosnami) - Ogilvie-Grant, 1907: Also named Bocage's bristlebill. Found from eastern Democratic Republic of the Congo to southern Sudan, western Kenya, north-western Zambia

References

red-tailed bristlebill
Birds of the African tropical rainforest
red-tailed bristlebill
Taxonomy articles created by Polbot